Ponor Saddle (‘Sedlovina Ponor’ \se-dlo-vi-'na po-'nor\) is the 1.6 km long ice-covered flat saddle of elevation 2340 m linking Mount Allen and Mount Liptak in southern Sentinel Range, Ellsworth Mountains of Antarctica.  It is part of the glacial divide between Bolgrad Glacier and Kornicker Glacier.

The feature is named after the settlement of Ponor in western Bulgaria.

Location

Maps
 Vinson Massif.  Scale 1:250000 topographic map.  Reston, Virginia: US Geological Survey, 1988.

Notes

References
 Ponor Saddle. SCAR Composite Antarctic Gazetteer.
 Bulgarian Antarctic Gazetteer. Antarctic Place-names Commission. (details in Bulgarian, basic data in English)

External links
 Ponor Saddle. Copernix satellite image

Mountain passes of Ellsworth Land
Bulgaria and the Antarctic